Hopkinton is a city in Delaware County, Iowa, United States.  The population was 622 at the time of the 2020 census.

History
Hopkinton was laid out in 1850, and it was incorporated in 1874.

The city is the former home of Lenox College, a small school that closed in 1944. The old campus is still maintained as Delaware County Historical Museum Complex.

Geography
Hopkinton is located at  (42.3438857, -91.2484799), near the Maquoketa River.

Demographics

2010 census
As of the census of 2010, there were 628 people, 266 households, and 185 families living in the city. The racial makeup of the city was 99.0% White, 0.3% from other races, and 0.6% from two or more races. Hispanic or Latino of any race were 0.8% of the population.

There were 266 households, of which 30.8% had children under the age of 18 living with them, 51.5% were married couples living together, 12.0% had a female householder with no husband present, 6.0% had a male householder with no wife present, and 30.5% were non-families. 25.9% of all households were made up of individuals, and 13.6% had someone living alone who was 65 years of age or older. The average household size was 2.36 and the average family size was 2.76.

The median age in the city was 43.8 years. 24% of residents were under the age of 18; 7.7% were between the ages of 18 and 24; 20.6% were from 25 to 44; 28.7% were from 45 to 64; and 19.1% were 65 years of age or older. The gender makeup of the city was 49.2% male and 50.8% female.

2000 census
As of the census of 2000, there were 681 people, 275 households, and 187 families living in the city. The racial makeup of the city was 98.68% White, and 1.32% from two or more races. Hispanic or Latino of any race were 0.15% of the population.

There were 275 households, out of which 34.2% had children under the age of 18 living with them, 52.7% were married couples living together, 11.3% had a female householder with no husband present, and 32.0% were non-families. 26.9% of all households were made up of individuals, and 14.5% had someone living alone who was 65 years of age or older. The average household size was 2.48 and the average family size was 3.03.

In the city, the population was spread out, with 28.0% under the age of 18, 8.2% from 18 to 24, 28.3% from 25 to 44, 19.1% from 45 to 64, and 16.3% who were 65 years of age or older. The median age was 37 years. For every 100 females, there were 102.7 males. For every 100 females age 18 and over, there were 90.7 males.

The median income for a household in the city was $33,958, and the median income for a family was $42,589. Males had a median income of $28,333 versus $19,773 for females. The per capita income for the city was $13,707. About 3.4% of families and 4.9% of the population were below the poverty line, including 2.6% of those under age 18 and 7.2% of those age 65 or over.

Education
The Maquoketa Valley Community School District operates local area public schools.

Notable people

 Charles Merriam (1874–1953), professor of political science at the University of Chicago, founder of the behavioralistic approach to political science, a prominent intellectual in the Progressive Movement, and an advisor to several U.S. Presidents.
 Frank Merriam (1865–1955), politician, 28th governor of California, Iowa State Auditor, served in the Iowa and California state legislatures.
 John Merriam (1869–1945), paleontologist, educator, conservationist. He is best known for his taxonomy of vertebrate fossils at the La Brea Tar Pits in Los Angeles.

References

External links

 , official website
 City-Data Comprehensive Statistical Data and more about Hopkinton
 Fading to what?, article about Hopkinton

Cities in Iowa
Cities in Delaware County, Iowa
1850 establishments in Iowa
Populated places established in 1850